Girl Friends is a 1936 Soviet drama film, directorial debut of Lev Arnshtam. The film tells story of the friendship between three girls from Petrograd who grow up together and become nurses during the Russian Civil War. The film was released in the US in 1936 as Three Women.

Plot summary

Cast
 Zoya Fyodorova - Zoya
 Yanina Zhejmo - Asya
 Irina Zarubina - Natasha
 Boris Chirkov - Senka
 Boris Babochkin - Andrei
 Nikolay Cherkasov - White Army officer
 Vasili Merkuryev
 Boris Blinov
 Maria Blumenthal-Tamarina
 Pavel Volkov
 Stepan Kayukov
 Stepan Krylov
 Boris Poslavsky
 Serafima Birman
 I. Antipova
 D. Pape
 Varvara Popova
 Vera Popova		
 Pavel Sukhanov

References

External links
 
 

1936 films
Lenfilm films
Soviet black-and-white films
Films directed by Lev Arnshtam
Russian Civil War films
Films scored by Dmitri Shostakovich
Soviet drama films
1936 drama films
1930s Russian-language films